This article contains information, results and statistics regarding the Australian national cricket team in the 2009 and 2009-10 cricket seasons. Statisticians class the 2009 season and 2009–10 season as those matches played on tours that started between May 2009 and April 2010.

Player contracts
The 2009-10 list was announced on 14 May 2009. Note that uncontracted players are still available to be selected to play for the national cricket team.

Match summary

P = Matches Played/Total Matches, W = Won, L = Lost, D = Drawn, T = Tied, NR = No Result
N.B. Result from All-Star match not included as it was only an exhibition match.

2009 season

Pakistan v Australia in UAE

 This series was moved from Pakistan to UAE for security reasons.

ICC World Twenty20

Tour of England

Tour of Scotland

2009–10 Season

2009 ICC Champions Trophy

The 2009 ICC Champions Trophy was scheduled to take place in the 2008–09 season in Pakistan, but because of an unstable security situation, it was rescheduled for the 2009–10 season. The hosting rights were also moved from Pakistan to South Africa. Sri Lanka was considered as a potential host, but was discarded due to worries related to the weather during that time of the year in Sri Lanka.

Tour of India

The Australian Cricket Team toured India from 25 October to 11 November 2009. The tour consists of 7 ODIs which Australia won 4–2.

Johnnie Walker All*Star Twenty20 match
The Australian Cricket team played an exhibition Twenty20 match against an all star cricket team featuring up and coming first class cricketers and Australian cricket legends to open the 2009/10 summer of international cricket in Australia. The Australian Cricketers' Association (ACA) XI all star team consisted of legends Adam Gilchrist, Matthew Hayden, Glenn McGrath & Shane Warne who is the captain. They were coached by former Australian fast bowler Dennis Lillee.

West Indies in Australia

The tour began with a practice match for the West Indians against Queensland starting 18 November. The first test began on 26 November and the tour will conclude on 23 February with a T20I. In all the tour included one First Class match, one List A match, three Tests, five ODIs and two T20Is.

Pakistan in Australia

The tour started on 19 December with a three-day first class match against Tasmania. This was followed on 26 December with the Boxing Day Test match at the MCG. It concluded on 5 February with a T20I at the MCG. In all the tour included three tests, five ODIs and a T20I.

Tour of New Zealand

The Australia Cricket Team toured New Zealand from 26 February to 31 March 2010. The tour consisted of 2 Twenty20s, 5 One Day Internationals and 2 Tests.

Important events

See also

 Australia national cricket team

References

Australia in international cricket
International cricket competitions in 2009–10
National team